Desera is a genus of beetles in the family Carabidae, containing the following species:

 Desera australis (Peringuey, 1896) 
 Desera bicoloripennis (Liang & Kavanaugh, 2007) 
 Desera coelestina (Klug, 1834) 
 Desera confusa W.Hansen, 1968 
 Desera crassa Andrewes, 1931 
 Desera dimidiata (Putzeys, 1880) 
 Desera elegans (Sloane, 1907) 
 Desera geniculata (Klug, 1834) 
 Desera gestroi Bates, 1892 
 Desera gilsoni Dupuis, 1912 
 Desera inexpectus (Liang & Kavanaugh, 2007) 
 Desera javanus (Liang & Kavanaugh, 2007) 
 Desera kulti Jedlicka, 1960 
 Desera longicollis (W.S.Macleay, 1825) 
 Desera micropectinatus (Liang & Kavanaugh, 2007) 
 Desera nepalensis Hope, 1831 
 Desera nigripennis (Liang & Kavanaugh, 2007) 
 Desera parallela (Chaudoir, 1872)  
 Desera queenslandicus (Liang & Kavanaugh, 2007) 
 Desera schultzei Heller, 1923 
 Desera sinicus (Liang & Kavanaugh, 2007) 
 Desera smaragdina (Chaudoir, 1961) 
 Desera ternatensis (Chaudoir, 1872) 
 Desera unidentata (W.S.Macleay, 1825) 
 Desera viridipennis Hope, 1842

References

Dryptinae